Cryptandra speciosa is a species of flowering plant in the family Rhamnaceae and is endemic to eastern Australia. It is a shrub with clusters of linear to narrowly elliptic leaves, and clusters white, tube-shaped flowers in leaf axils.

Description
The edges of the leaves are rolled under, obscuring the lower surface, and the upper surface is glabrous.

Taxonomy and naming
Cryptandra speciosa was first formally described in 2007 by Jürgen Kellermann and Frank Udovicic in the Proceedings of the Linnean Society of New South Wales from an unpublished description by Allan Cunningham. The specific epithet (speciosa) means "showy" or "splendid".

In the same journal, Kellermann and Udovicic described two subspecies of C. speciosa , and the names are accepted by the Australian Plant Census:

Distribution and habitat
Subspecies speciosa grows in sandy soil over sandstone or volcanic rocks, and is found in woodland and Callitris forest on the tablelands of New South Wales to the Victorian Alps near the border with New South Wales. Subspecies strigosa grows on poor soil on sandstone and rocky outcrops between the Narrien Range and Carnarvon National Park in the Leichhardt and South Kennedy districts of central Queensland.

Conservation status
Subspecies speciosa is listed as "critically endangered" in Victoria under the Victorian Government Flora and Fauna Guarantee Act.

References

speciosa
Rosales of Australia
Flora of Queensland
Flora of New South Wales
Flora of the Australian Capital Territory
Plants described in 1837